Mariann Fischer Boel (born 15 April 1943, in Åsum) is a Danish politician, serving as European Commissioner for Agriculture and Rural Development from 2004 to 2009. A member of the party Venstre, she had previously been minister of agriculture and foods since 2002, in the government of Anders Fogh Rasmussen.

In 2008, she was given the European Taxpayers' Award from the Taxpayers' Association of Europe for her decision to abolish export refunds for exports of live cattle from the EU, and for her ongoing efforts to improve the transparency of agricultural payments.

In 2008, she was presented with the Danish European Movement's price for "European of the Year".

In 2008, she was awarded the Wine Personality of the Year 2008 award by the International Wine Challenge, which said, about her efforts to drag the European wine industry into the 21st century, that "family vineyards might have been pulled up and the family winemaking tradition lost had it not been for the intrepid heroine from the north".

References

External links

 
 Mariann Fischer Boel's blog

|-

|-

1943 births
Living people
Danish European Commissioners
Government ministers of Denmark
Members of the Folketing
Venstre (Denmark) politicians
Women European Commissioners
Women government ministers of Denmark
Women members of the Folketing